The 12061 / 12062 Rani Kamalapati–Jabalpur Jan Shatabdi Express is a type of Shatabdi Express train service offered by West Central Railway.

Service

Route & halts

 
 Itarsi Junction

Locomotive

The train is hauled by Itarsi-based WAP-4 locomotive from Bhopal Habibganj to  handing over to a Tughlakabad-based WAP-7 locomotive to Jabalpur Junction after rake-reversal.

Coach composition
The train consists of 18 coaches viz., four  AC Chair Car and twelve 2nd Sitting and 1 EOG (power car) and 1 SLR.

E-catering

 E-catering available at:- Habibganj (HBJ), Itarsi (ET), Jabalpur Junction (JBP).

References

External links
HBJ JBP Janshatabdi Express India Rail Info

Jan Shatabdi Express trains
Rail transport in Madhya Pradesh
Transport in Bhopal
Transport in Jabalpur
Railway services introduced in 2002